This is a list of notable hotels in South Africa.

Gauteng

Johannesburg Metropole
 Michelangelo Towers, Sandton

KwaZulu-Natal

Durban Metropole
 The Oyster Box, Umhlanga

Elephant Coast
 Thanda Safari, near Hluhluwe

Limpopo
 The Ranch Resort, near Polokwane

North West
 
 Rio Casino Resort, Klerksdorp
 Sun City

Western Cape

Cape Winelands
 Le Quartier Français, Franschhoek

Swartberg
 The Royal Hotel, Riebeek-Kasteel

See also
 List of restaurants in South Africa
 List of companies of South Africa
 Lists of hotels – an index of hotel list articles on Wikipedia

References

External links
 

Hotels in South Africa
South Africa
Hotels